Kiche is a rural locality (a selo) in Rutulskoye Rural Settlement, Rutulsky District, Republic of Dagestan, Russia. The population was 441 as of 2010. There is 1 street.

Geography 
Kiche is located on the left bank of the Samur river, 5 km east of Rutul (the district's administrative centre) by road. Khlyut and Zrykh are the nearest rural localities.

Nationalities 
Rutuls live there.

Famous residents 
 K. O. Gadzhiyev (People's teacher of the DASSR and Azerbaijan SSR, holder of the Order of Lenin)
 Saidmagomed Guseynov (Member of the Union of Writers of Russia, member of the Union of Journalists of Russia)

References 

Rural localities in Rutulsky District